Mohamed el-Hibri (1910–1999) of the Lebanese Scouting Federation served as a member of the Arab Scout Committee.

He was the son of Arab Scouting pioneer Toufik el-Hibri. In 1956 he was the first president of the League of Arab Scouts, the forerunner to the Arab Scout Committee.

In 1973, he was awarded the 80th Bronze Wolf, the only distinction of the World Organization of the Scout Movement, awarded by the World Scout Committee for exceptional services to world Scouting.

References

External links

Recipients of the Bronze Wolf Award
Scouting and Guiding in Lebanon
1910 births
1999 deaths